Sarah Putnam may refer to:

 Sarah Gooll Putnam (1851–1912), American painter
 Sarah Ann Brock Putnam (1831–1911), American author